The Westgate School is a co-educational secondary school with academy status in the Cippenham area of the town of Slough in the English county of Berkshire. It educates around 900 pupils

The school's most recent Ofsted report, from March 2014, judged the school to be 'Outstanding'. Previous inspections in 2004 and 2008 judged the school to be 'Good', describing the school as 'a very good school where extremely positive attitudes to learning are fostered and pupils achieve to their full potential' and in 2008 as 'a good school with many outstanding features' 

The school celebrated its 60th anniversary on 27 September 2018.

References

Secondary schools in Slough
Academies in Slough
Educational institutions established in 1958
1958 establishments in England